Narsinghpur or Narasinghapur is a village in CD block Jalangi in the Domkal subdivision of the Murshidabad district in the state of West Bengal, India. It was formerly under Jalangi Police Station but now it is under newly formed Sagarpara Police Station. The district headquarters is located at a distance of 65 km from Berhampore.

It has a population of around 5,000, engaged in trades , small scale industries , agricultural and .It lies at the geographic co-ordinates of latitude 24.2009204, longitude 88.6939674.

There is a many Temples and education Schools & Colleges situated near Narasinghapur. Narasinghapur is located under Jalangi police station in West Bengal. It is 2 kilometres from the Padma River.

Location

Education

Schools
Narasinghapur Primary School.  
Bhagini Nibedita Shyamali
Narasinghapur Haldarpara SSK

Colleges
Narasinghapurur P.T.T.I. College.
Nibedita Institute of Technology.
Paradise Institute of Technology.
Narasinghapur Primary Teacher Training College.
Hemchandra B.Ed. & D.El.Ed.
Discovery Institute of Polytechnic.
 Gitanjali B.Ed. College.
 Godagari P.T.T.I. College.

Culture

Festival

Namjagya, Durga Puja & Kali Puja is one of the Best festival in this area.

Nature 
Naturally beautiful place.

References

External links
 Narasinghapur Facebook Page 
 Narasinghapur on Youtube

Villages in Murshidabad district